Sokolki (Soqalı) is a rural locality (a selo) in Novobelokataysky Selsoviet, Belokataysky District, Bashkortostan, Russia. The population was 256 as of 2010. There are 8 streets.

Geography 
Sokolki is located 6 km northwest of Novobelokatay (the district's administrative centre) by road. Novobelokatay is the nearest rural locality.

References 

Rural localities in Belokataysky District